Rufo is a surname. Notable people with the surname include:

 Antonio Gómez Rufo (born 1954), Spanish writer
 Christopher Rufo (born 1984), American conservative activist
 Robert Rufo, American jurist and politician

See also
 Rufo (given name)
 Ruffo